Axel Geller and Hsu Yu-hsiou were the defending champions, but both players were ineligible to participate in junior events.

Yankı Erel and Otto Virtanen won the title, defeating Nicolás Mejía and Ondřej Štyler in the final, 7–6(7–5), 6–4.

Seeds

Draw

Finals

Top half

Bottom half

External links 
 Draw

Boys' Doubles
Wimbledon Championship by year – Boys' doubles